The Alliance Party was a political coalition in Malaysia. The Alliance Party, whose membership comprised United Malays National Organisation (UMNO), Malaysian Chinese Association (MCA) and Malaysian Indian Congress (MIC), was formally registered as a political organisation on 30 October 1957.  It was the ruling coalition of Malaya from 1957 to 1963, and Malaysia from 1963 to 1973.  The coalition became the Barisan Nasional in 1973.

History

Origin
The Alliance Party had its origin in an ad hoc and temporary electoral arrangement set up between the local branches of UMNO and MCA to contest the Kuala Lumpur municipal election in 1952.  The UMNO-MCA candidates won in 9 of the 12 seats contested, beating the non-communal Independence of Malaya Party (IMP) which won 2 seats and Selangor Labour Party which won none. Their success in this election led to firmer association between the two parties and further successes in other municipal elections that the UMNO-MCA alliance contested (apart from Penang where UMNO was allied with the Muslim League). In 1954, the alliance was joined by MIC that previously supported IMP. Although for a time other parties were also associated with the Alliance Party, the three parties (UMNO, MCA, MIC) remained the core of the coalition until 1971.

In 1955, in the first general election for the Federal Legislative Council in what was then the British protectorate of the Federation of Malaya, the UMNO-MCA-MIC Alliance successfully gained the great majority of seats available for contest, winning 51 of the 52 seats contested with a vote of 81.7%. It formally registered as a political organisation on 30 October 1957.

1957–1972
The Alliance played an important role in negotiating the transition from British rule to independence, and facilitating the preparation of its constitution.  After the Malaya had gained independence on 31 August 1957, the General Election was held in 1959. The Alliance won 51.5% of the popular vote and 74 of the 104 seats contested, defeating the Pan Malaysian Islamic Party (PMIP, 21.2%) and the Socialist Front coalition (13%).

The Alliance was also credited with securing the formation of the Federation of Malaysia on 16 September 1963. After Malaysia came into being, the Alliance Party of the Malay peninsula became closely associated with other alliance parties in Sabah and Sarawak.

In the 1964 general election, boosted by the formation of Malaysia and the subsequent confrontation with Indonesia, the Alliance Party was even more successful, winning a majority (58.4%) of the votes and securing 89 of the 104 seats contested. The Alliance had strong support among rural Malays (apart from the east coast of Malaysia where support for PMIP was still significant), while other opposition parties had support among the Chinese urban population.

In the 1969 general election, although the Alliance Party won the most seats, it garnered less than half the popular vote due to strong challenges from the opposition parties, in particular the newly formed Democratic Action Party and Gerakan. PMIP also gained support at the expense of UMNO but the number of seats gained was smaller. The unease and anxiety after the election led to the May 13 riots, and the declaration of a state of emergency.  After the Malaysian Parliament reconvened in 1971, negotiations began with former opposition parties such as Gerakan and People's Progressive Party, both of which joined the Alliance in 1972, quickly followed by PMIP. In 1973, the Alliance Party was formally replaced by Barisan Nasional, a coalition of 9 parties, and the Barisan Nasional was registered in June 1974 to contest the 1974 general election.

Component parties
Alliance Party (Malaya)
 United Malays National Organisation (UMNO) (1952-1973)
 Malaysian Chinese Association (MCA) (1952-1973)
 Malaysian Indian Congress (MIC) (1954-1973)
 People's Progressive Party (PPP) (1954-1955, 1972-1973)
 Radical Party (1954-1959)
 Muslim League (1954-1963)
 Parti Gerakan Rakyat Malaysia (Gerakan) (1972-1973)
 Pan-Malaysian Islamic Party (PMIP) (1972-1973)

Sabah Alliance
 United National Kadazan Organisation (UNKO) (1963-1964)
 United Pasokmomogun Kadazan Organisation (UPKO) (1964-1967)
 United Sabah National Organisation (USNO) (1963-1976)
 Sabah Chinese Association (SCA) (1963-1976)
 Sabah Indian Congress (SIC) (1963-1976)

Sabah Alliance was a component party of Barisan Nasional from 1973 to several months before 1976 Sabah election. In that state election, Sabah Alliance clashed with federal BN-supported BERJAYA party. It disbanded after the election. USNO and BERJAYA joined Barisan Nasional after Double-Six Accident

Sarawak Alliance
 Sarawak National Party (SNAP) (1962-1966)
 Sarawak Chinese Association (SCA) (1962-1973)
 Sarawak Nation Party (PANAS) (1962-1963, 1965-1968)
 Sarawak Native People's Front (BARJASA) (1962-1968)
 Sarawak Native Heritage Party (PESAKA) (1962-1969)
 Native People's Party (BUMIPUTERA) (1968-1973)
 Sarawak United Peoples' Party (SUPP) (1970-1973) (allied party)

Singapore Alliance (1963-1965)
 United Malays National Organisation (UMNO)
 Malaysian Chinese Association (MCA)
 Malaysian Indian Congress (MIC)
 Singapore People's Alliance (SPA)

Elected representatives
List of Malayan State and Settlement Council Representatives (1954–59)
Members of the Federal Legislative Council (1955–59)
Members of the Dewan Rakyat, 1st Malayan Parliament
List of Malaysian State Assembly Representatives (1959–64)
Members of the Dewan Rakyat, 2nd Malaysian Parliament
List of Malaysian State Assembly Representatives (1964–69)
Members of the Dewan Rakyat, 3rd Malaysian Parliament
List of Malaysian State Assembly Representatives (1969–74)

General election results

State election results

See also
 Barisan Nasional

References

1952 establishments in Malaya
Defunct political party alliances in Malaysia
Political parties disestablished in 1973
Political parties established in 1952